Three chorale fantasias (Drei Choralphantasien), Op. 52, are chorale fantasias for organ by Max Reger. They were all first performed individually by Reger's friend Karl Straube, and were first published by Breitkopf & Härtel.

Straube and others regarded especially No. 2 highly, Straube called it "großartigste Leistung" (most extraordinary achievement).

History 
Reger composed the works in September 1900 in Weiden in der Oberpfalz. He dated No. 2 on 15 September 1900, and sent the works to the publisher on 22 October 1900. Reger wrote dedications: 
 No. 1: "Sr. Hochwürden Herrn Professor Dr. Julius Smend hochachtungsvollst zugeeignet" (Most respectfully dedicated to the Very Reverend Professor Dr Julius Smend)
 No. 2: "Meinem Freunde Karl Straube in herzlichster Dankbarkeit zugeeignet" (Dedicated to my friend Karl Straube, with cordial gratitude) 
 No. 3: "Herrn Friedrich L. Schnackenberg hochachtungsvollst zugeeignet" (Most respectfully dedicated to Mr Friedrich L. Schnackenberg)

No. 3 was first performed by Straube on 9 November 1901 at the Walcker organ of the Kaim-Saal in Munich.

The duration is given as 16–17 min. for No. 1, 17–19 min. for No. 2, 15–17 min for No. 3.

No. 1 
The text of the chorale "Alle Menschen müssen sterben" was written by Johann Georg Albinus in 1652.

The fantasia is structured in six sections, based on four of the seven stanzas of the hymn.
 Introduzione
 Strophe I "Alle Menschen müssen sterben" ("All men must die")
 Interlude
 Strophe III "Jesus ist für mich gestorben" ("Jesus died for me")
 Strophe VI "O Jerusalem, du schöne" ("O Jerusalem the lovely")
 Strophe VII "Ach, ich habe schon erblicket" ("Ah, mine eyes have truly seen")

Unlike other chorale fantasias, this work ends not with a fugue. I alternates stanzas with relation to the chorale tune with free stanzas. The introduction ("Introduzione") presents several motifs, including a large leap downward as a "Todesmotiv" (motif of death), and a downward sequence of chords as an "Auferstehungsmotiv" (motif of resurrection).

Reger wrote a copy for Straube and added the dedication: "Recht inniges Vergnügen, lieber Carl! Im Falle es beim Anhören dieses 'Verbrechens' Todte geben sollte, übernehme ich die Beerdigungskosten. Besten Gruß Dein alter Organiste Max Reger" ("Quite heartfelt pleasure, dear Carl! In case of deaths when listening to this "crime" , I will assume the costs of the funerals. Best greeting, your old organist, Max Reger").

No. 2 
The fantasia is based on Philipp Nicolai's hymn in three stanzas "Wachet auf, ruft uns die Stimme", published in 1599.

Reger uses the last lines as they still appeared in the Evangelisches Kirchengesangbuch (EKG) of 1950:

The fantasia is structured in four parts, an introduction and one four each stanza, the last one as a fugue:
 Introduzione
 Strophe I "Wachet auf! ruft uns die Stimme"
 Strophe II "Zion hört die Wächter singen"
 Fuge und Strophe III "Gloria sei dir gesungen"

The introduction is marked grave assai. Form and rhythm of the beginning, marked pppp, appear undecided. The sombre atmosphere is interrupted only by two forceful entries (marked fff) which have been characterized as "niedersausende Blitze" (striking lightning). Martin Weyer regarded the section as contrasting quiet night and commencing judgement".

The chorale tune appears first in measure 11, in "sehr lichte Registrierung" (very light registration). The lines of the poem are interrupted by interludes. Reger establishes a contrast of "himmlische Herrlichkeit" (heavenly glory) and "irdische Finsternis" (earthly darkness). Straube notes:

No. 3 
The text of the chorale "Halleluja! The melody is by Johann Georg Bätzler.

The fantasie is structured in an introduction, marked vivace assai – vivacissimo, and seven chorale stanzas, concluded by a coda:
 Introducion
 Strophe I "Hallelujah! Gott zu loben"
 Strophe II „Setzt auf Fürsten kein Vertrauen“
 Strophe III "Heil dem, der im Erdenleben"
 Strophe IV "Er, der Himmel, Meer und Erde"“
 Strophen V "Er ist's, der den Fremdling schützet" and VI "Er, der Herr, ist's, der den Blinden"
 Fugue and Strophe VII "Er ist Gott und Herr und König"

In the coda, the first two lines of the chorale melody as a canon in soprano and bass.

Editions

Selected recordings 
On organs from Reger's era:
 Christoph Bossert: Max Reger. Drei Choralfantasien Op. 52. recorded in 1990 at the Link  organ of the Protestant Church in Giengen an der Brenz
 Christoph Bossert: Max Reger. Drei Choralphantasien Op. 52. recorded in 2006 at the Link organ
 Martin Sander: Max Reger. Orgelwerke Vol. 2. (organ of the Riga Cathedral; Op. 52 No. 2)
 Balázs Szabó: Max Reger. Die 7 Choralfantasien, SACD No. 2: Op. 52, recorded in 2015 at the Kuhn organ (1914) of St. Anton in Zurich

On modern organs:
 Jean-Baptiste Dupont: Max Reger. Sämtliche Orgelwerke Vol. 1. (organ of the Magdeburg Cathedral; Op. 52 Nos. 1–3)
 Kari Vuola: Max Reger: Orgelwerke. Drei Phantasien für Orgel Op. 52. (organ of the Tampere Cathedral;, Op. 52 Nos. 1–3)

References

Bibliography

External links 
 
 Max Reger / Chorale Fantasia ("Alle Menschen müssen sterben"), Op. 52/1  AllMusic
 Robert Cummings: Max Reger / Chorale Fantasia ("Wachet auf, ruft uns die Stimme"), Op. 52/2 AllMusic
 Max Reger / Chorale Fantasia ("Halleluja! Gott zu loben, bleibe meine Seelenfreud"), for organ, Op. 52/3 AllMusic

Compositions for organ
Compositions by Max Reger